Wahid Majrooh (وحید مجروح; born 1985) is the acting Minister of Public Health of Afghanistan. Hailing from Shindand District, he graduated from Herat University in 2008.

References

Living people
1985 births
Health ministers of Afghanistan
Public health ministers
People from Herat Province
Herat University alumni
Date of birth missing (living people)
Afghan physicians